New old stock (NOS), or old stock for short, refers to aged stock of merchandise that was never sold to a customer and still new in original packaging.  Such merchandise may not be manufactured anymore, and the new old stock may represent the only current source of a particular item. There is no consensus on how old a product must be to be NOS, and some people reserve an NOS label only for products that are actually discontinued.

Although not an officially recognized accounting term, it is in common use in the auction and retail industries. For example, owners of classic, vintage, and antique vehicles seek NOS parts that are needed to keep their bicycles, automobiles, motorcycles, or trucks operational, or in factory-original condition. These owners put a premium on NOS parts.

Another definition of NOS is new original stock, meaning that they are original equipment parts that remained in inventory for a use that never came. Automobile dealers and parts companies often sell such slow-moving stock at a discount. Other specialty parts vendors then market these NOS parts that may either decline or increase in value depending on their type and desirability.

See also
 Do-it-yourself
 Mint condition
 Original equipment manufacturer

References

Contexts for auctions
Inventory